A statue of William Ellery Channing is installed near the intersection of Boylston and Arlington in Boston Public Garden, in Boston, Massachusetts, United States. The statue stands under a marble structure.

References

External links
 
 William Ellery Channing – Boston, MA at Waymarking

Boston Public Garden
Monuments and memorials in Boston
Outdoor sculptures in Boston
Sculptures of men in Massachusetts
Statues in Boston